Broadcasting House is the headquarters of the BBC, in Portland Place and Langham Place, London

Broadcasting House may also refer to:

Buildings occupied by the British Broadcasting Corporation 
Broadcasting House, Cardiff, former the headquarters of BBC Wales
Broadcasting House, Belfast, the headquarters of BBC Northern Ireland
 Broadcasting House, Bangor, BBC Wales premises in Bangor, Wales
Broadcasting House, Bristol, the headquarters of the BBC West region
 Broadcasting House, Ipswich, the home of BBC Radio Suffolk
 Broadcasting House, Leeds, the former headquarters of BBC Yorkshire
 Broadcasting House, Northampton, the home of BBC Radio Northampton
 Broadcasting House, Plymouth, the headquarters of the BBC South West region
 Broadcasting House, Southampton, the headquarters of the BBC South region
 Broadcasting House, Edinburgh, BBC Scotland former premises in Edinburgh, now known as The Jam House 
 Broadcasting House, Glasgow, BBC Scotland former premises in Glasgow 
BBC Cymru Wales New Broadcasting House (Cardiff), the headquarters of BBC Cymru Wales
New Broadcasting House, Manchester, the former headquarters of the BBC North West region in Manchester
 Old Broadcasting House, the vacated headquarters of the BBC North region in Leeds, now part of Leeds Metropolitan University's School of Computing and Creative Technologies 
 Broadcasting House, Jersey, original headquarters of BBC Radio Jersey

Other broadcasting buildings 
Broadcasting House (Athens), a building at the Hellenic Broadcasting Corporation headquarters
Broadcasting House (Oslo), a building at the NRK headquarters
 Broadcasting House (RTHK), headquarters of Radio Television Hong Kong, New Kowloon
 Broadcast House, the name for the studios of WXYZ-TV in Detroit, Michigan
Rediffusion House, a building housing Malta's Public Broadcasting Services
 Broadcasting House, the headquarters of Manx Radio in Douglas, Isle of Man.

Radio programmes
 Broadcasting House (radio programme), a programme on BBC Radio 4

BBC offices, studios and buildings